Costume was a Finnish-language monthly women's and fashion magazine published in Helsinki, Finland. It was the Finnish version of the magazine with the same name which is also published in Norway and Denmark. The magazine was in circulation between 2012 and 2014.

History and profile
Costume was first published by Bonnier Publishing Oy on 22 August 2012. The magazine was part of the Bonnier Group until February 2014 when it was acquired by Aller Media. Following the transaction its publisher became Aller Media Oy. The magazine was headquartered in Helsinki and published on a monthly basis.

The target audience of Costume was young women in their twenties. The magazine featured articles on fashion, beauty, food, travel and also, covers celebrity interviews. It has also online and mobile editions. Sanna Sierilä served as the editor-in-chief of the magazine.

In 2013 Costume sold 24,009 copies. Following its acquisition by the Aller media the magazine folded in 2014.

See also
 List of magazines in Finland

References

External links
 Official website

2012 establishments in Finland
2014 disestablishments in Finland
Bonnier Group
Celebrity magazines
Defunct magazines published in Finland
Finnish-language magazines
Magazines established in 2012
Magazines disestablished in 2014
Magazines published in Helsinki
Monthly magazines published in Finland
Women's magazines published in Finland
Women's fashion magazines